Eric Peters (born May 30, 1997) is a Canadian recurve archer. He won gold at the 2019 Pan American Games in Lima as part of the team competition alongside teammates Crispin Duenas and Brian Maxwell. Peters also won a bronze in the individual event in Lima, upsetting world record holder Brady Ellison in the quarterfinals.

References

1997 births
Living people
Canadian male archers
Sportspeople from Ottawa
Pan American Games gold medalists for Canada
Pan American Games bronze medalists for Canada
Pan American Games medalists in archery
Archers at the 2019 Pan American Games
Archers at the 2014 Summer Youth Olympics
Medalists at the 2019 Pan American Games
Youth Olympic bronze medalists for Canada
20th-century Canadian people
21st-century Canadian people